Fallon is a given name of the following people:

Fallon Bowman (born 1983), South African born Canadian musician 
Fallon Fox (born 1975), American mixed martial arts fighter
Fallon Kelly (1907–1992), United States Attorney
Fallon King (born 1988), American singer and member of Cherish
Fallon Sherrock (born 1994), English darts player
Fallon Taylor (born 1982), American barrel racer
Fallon Carrington Colby, a character in the television series Dynasty